The 1902–03 Michigan State Spartans men's basketball team represents Michigan State University for the 1902–03 college men's basketball season. The school was known as State Agricultural College at this time. The head coach was George Denman coaching the team his second season. The team captain was Joseph Hoftencamp. The team finished the season 6–0.

Schedule

|-
!colspan=9 style=| Regular season
|-

Source

References

Michigan State Spartans men's basketball seasons
Michigan State
Michigan State|Michigan
Michigan State|Michigan